is a 2013 Japanese film directed by Yukihiko Tsutsumi. The first part, was released on 1 November, and the second part, was released on 29 November. This film is a sequel to the 2012 film SPEC: Ten, and the last of the SPEC series.

Cast
 Erika Toda as Saya Tōma
 Ryo Kase as Takeru Sebumi
 Kazuki Kitamura as Shū Kikkawa
 Chiaki Kuriyama as Satoko Aoike
 Osamu Mukai as Sekai
 Yuu Kashii as Jōkai Jōkyokusai
 Kasumi Arimura as Miyabi Masaki
 Kenichi Endō as T. Hideki
 Yuko Asano as Madam Yang/Madam Yin
 Ryūnosuke Kamiki as Jūichi Ninomae
 Saki Fukuda as Mirei Shimura
 Yū Shirota as Satoshi Chii
 Yuko Oshima as a mysterious woman

Reception
Almost a month after being released, the film had grossed ¥2.23 billion (US$22 million).

References

External links
 
 
 劇場版 SPEC～結（クローズ）～ 漸（ゼン）ノ篇(2013) at allcinema 
 劇場版 SPEC～結（クローズ）～ 爻（コウ）ノ篇(2013) at allcinema 
 劇場版 SPEC 結（クローズ） 漸（ゼン）ノ篇 at KINENOTE 
 劇場版 SPEC 結（クローズ） 爻（コウ）ノ篇 at KINENOTE 

Films directed by Yukihiko Tsutsumi
Japanese sequel films
Tokyo Metropolitan Police Department in fiction
2010s Japanese films